The Cebu City Chiefs are a  rugby league team based in Cebu City, Philippines. They play in the Philippines National Rugby League. They were formed by Rene Payne and Clayton Watene and Captain Gavin Odell.

History
The club was founded in early 2013, and made their debut in the Zamabales Rugby League International 9s Tournament

References

Philippines National Rugby League teams
Sports in Cebu
Rugby clubs established in 2013